Thé Tjong-Khing (born August 4, 1933) is a children's book illustrator based in the Netherlands.

He was born in Purworedjo, Java to a large Chinese Indonesian family.  As a child he was interested in the Tarzan comic strips of Edgar Rice Burroughs.  Thé attended the Seni Rupa (arts) institute in Bandung.  He came to the Netherlands in 1956 and started as a draftsman at the Toonder Studio's, initially as a volunteer and later as an employee.

In addition to his work on Oliver B. Bumble comics, he also contributed to the magazine Tina and created Arman & Ilva.  In 1970 he was asked to provide illustration for Miep Diekmann's children's book.  He became a freelance illustrator providing illustration to many children's book authors such as van Guus Kuijer, Els Pelgrom, Sylvia Vanden Heede en Dolf Verroen.

Thé won the Gouden Penseel (Golden Brush) award three times, and in 2005 won the Woutertje Pieterse Prijs for his book Waar is de taart? (Where is the cake?), a picturebook without text.  For this he also won the Zilveren Penseel and was nominated for the Deutsche Jugendliteraturpreis in 2007. In 2010 he won the Max Velthuijs-prijs (Max Velthuijs Prize).

Thé is also a film expert and has won many quizzes and contests over the years.

Thé is married to Mino Wortel-Thé, and has two sons: Markus and Erik.

Notes

References

External links 

 Official website (in Dutch)
 Biographical sketch (in English)
 Thé Tjong-Khing Background (in Dutch)

1933 births
Living people
Dutch cartoonists
Dutch comics artists
Dutch children's book illustrators
Dutch people of Chinese descent
Dutch people of Indonesian descent
Indonesian people of Chinese descent
People from Purworejo Regency
Woutertje Pieterse Prize winners
Max Velthuijs Prize winners
Gouden Penseel winners